This is a list of schools in the Borough of Darlington in County Durham, England.

State-funded schools

Primary schools

Abbey Infants' School
Abbey Junior School
Bishopton Redmarshall CE Primary School
Corporation Road Community Primary School
Firthmoor Primary School
Gurney Pease Academy
Harrowgate Hill Primary School
Heathfield Primary School
Heighington CE Primary School
High Coniscliffe CE Primary School
Holy Family RC Primary School
Hurworth Primary School
Mount Pleasant Primary School
Mowden Infant School
Mowden Junior School
Northwood Primary School
Polam Hall School
Red Hall Primary School
Reid Street Primary School
The Rydal Academy
St Augustine's RC Primary School
St Bede's RC Primary School
St George's CE Academy
St John's CE Academy
St Mary's Cockerton CE Primary School
St Teresa's RC Primary School
Skerne Park Academy
Springfield Academy
West Park Academy
Whinfield Primary School

Secondary schools

Carmel College
Haughton Academy
Hummersknott Academy
Hurworth School
Longfield Academy
Polam Hall School
St Aidan's Church of England Academy
Wyvern Academy

Special and alternative schools
Beaumont Hill Academy
Marchbank Free School
Rise Carr College

Further education
 Darlington College
 Queen Elizabeth Sixth Form College

Independent schools

Special and alternative schools
Embleton View
Oakwood Learning Centre
Pear Tree School
Priory Hurworth House

References

Darlington
Schools in the Borough of Darlington
Lists of buildings and structures in County Durham